Streptomyces durbertensis is a bacterium species from the genus of Streptomyces which has been isolated from saline-alkali soil from the Heilongjiang Province in China.

See also 
 List of Streptomyces species

References 

durbertensis
Bacteria described in 2018